ASEM Tower is an office building located in Samseong-dong, Gangnam district, Seoul. It was constructed for the 3rd Asia–Europe Meeting (ASEM 3) in 2000.

The 836-meter (914-yard) section of sidewalk along Yeongdong Boulevard from exit No. 5 of Samseong Station on Seoul Subway Line 2, outside the COEX Convention & Exhibition Center and ASEM Tower, is designated as a smoke-free zone by the Seoul Metropolitan Government.

Popular culture
Thirty-one seconds into the "Gangnam Style" music video, the Tower is the location where Psy is doing his horse-riding dance.

History
Construction began in 1997, with a planned period of about three years. Construction was headed by Daewoo Engineering & Construction, Samsung C&T and Hyundai Engineering & Construction.

On 1 January 2000, the Millennium Festival selected it as one of the "buildings symbolizing the new millennium" and held an event to turn on the entire building's lights on the arrival of the new year. It was opened in August 2000 at the time of the third Asia–Europe Meeting (ASEM) and approved for use on 13 March 2002.

In 2012, a Korean Wikipedia event was held to celebrate the 10th anniversary.

Facility
Most of the buildings consist of offices, and there are Ashem Tower on the 11th, 18th and 33rd floors, Pivotpoint Business Center on the 30th and 37th floors, and Machine Room on the 41st floors and other office facilities.

Characteristics
The building is 176 meters tall, similar to the height of 2IFC located in Yeouido, and has the Ashem Tower, except for 101-dong and 102-dong of Samsung-dong I'Park. Tower Palace has been the tallest tower since 2004, and besides, skyscrapers and skyscrapers weighing more than 200 meters are higher than the buildings.

See also
List of tallest buildings in Seoul

References

External links

World Trade Center Seoul
Buildings and structures in Gangnam District
Office buildings completed in 2000
Skyscraper office buildings in Seoul
2000 establishments in South Korea